Sts. Cyril and Methodius Church, commonly known as the Orthodox Church (Slovene: ,), is an Eastern Orthodox church building located in Trubar Park, between Bleiweis Street and Prešeren Street, north of the Museum of Modern Art and west of the National Gallery of Slovenia. It belongs to the Metropolitanate of Zagreb and Ljubljana of the Serbian Orthodox Church.

Built in Serbo-Byzantine Revival, the church has five domes with golden crosses at their top. It was built from 1932 to 1936 by Ivan Bricelj based on plans by the architect Momir Korunović. The frescoes in the interior were painted by the Serbian painters Dragomir Jašović, Miša Mladenović, and Danica Mladenovič from 1986 until 1997. The iconostasis is work of a prominent woodcarver workshop from Debar (Macedonia) and has been decorated with icons by the Slovene painter , who created them in 1940.

The foundation was blessed by Serbian Patriarch Varnava in 1932. The church was blessed on 23 October 2005 by the Serbian Patriarch Pavle in the presence of President Janez Drnovšek and Ljubljana's Roman Catholic metropolite Alojz Uran. This is also the date of official opening of the church. At the blessing they installed the relics of Saint Athanasius, which were brought from the Vatican by Tomáš Špidlík and symbolised the integration of one Christian unity (Orthodox and Catholic). In 2009, the church was visited by Serbian President Boris Tadić. Since 10 April 2010, the church has the status of a cultural monument of local significance.

References

External links 

 

Metropolitanate of Zagreb and Ljubljana
Serbian Orthodox church buildings in Slovenia
Neo-Byzantine architecture
Churches completed in 1936
Buildings and structures in Ljubljana